Black on white may refer to:

Black on White (1943 film), German/Austrian film
Black on White (1968 film), Finnish film
Light-on-dark color scheme
Black-on-white ware, design style employed in Pueblo pottery in the Southwest United States

See also
 Black or White (disambiguation)
 Black and White (disambiguation)